Andrew Rogers is a contemporary sculptor born in Australia whose works may be found in many plazas and buildings around the world. Rogers is the creator of the world's largest contemporary land art undertaking.  Titled "Rhythms of Life," the project commenced in 1998 and at present comprises 51 massive stone structures across 16 countries on seven continents and has involved over 7,500 people.

Rhythms of Life land art project

The title of the project, the "Rhythms of Life" is derived from Rogers' early bronze sculptures.

Of particular note is a site in Cappadocia, Turkey, where between 2007 and 2011 Rogers completed the "Time and Space" geoglyph park.

To date the project has involved over 7,500 people in 16 countries across seven continents.

Monumental geoglyphs have been constructed since 1998, forming a chain of 51 drawings on the earth visible from space. Outside Melbourne, in Geelong, a "Rhythms of Life" site was commissioned in association with the 2006 Commonwealth Games. In China the "Rhythms of Life" walls stretch .

In the book "Andrew Rogers Geoglyphs Rhythms of Life", author Eleanor Heartney, New York-based, award-winning art writer and independent art critic, describes Rogers' land art undertaking:

"The geographic and historic sweep of the works constructed as part of the Rhythms of Life project is unprecedented in its scale and ambition. Taken together, the geoglyphs have been erected in every kind of climate, and have responded to geographical environments as distinct as Nepal’s Himalayan Mountains, China’s Gobi Desert, the volcanic mountains of Iceland and the harsh Israeli desert."

According to Hannes Sigurdsson, Director of the Akureyri Art Museum in Iceland:

"The Rhythms of Life project by Australian artist Andrew Rogers is the largest contemporary land-art project in the world, forming a chain of stone sculptures, or geoglyphs, around the globe. Monumental geoglyphs have been constructed in ten countries to date: Israel, Chile, Bolivia, Sri Lanka, Australia, Iceland, China, India, Turkey and Nepal. Future locations will include the United States, United Kingdom, Eastern Europe and Africa. By completion, the project will have involved over 5,000 people on six continents. The Rhythms of Life sculptures are optimistic metaphors for the eternal cycle of life and regeneration, expressive and suggestive of human striving and introspection. The geoglyphs embrace a wide cultural vision that links memory and various symbols derived from ancient rock carvings, paintings and legends in each region; they punctuate time and extend history into the distant future while delving into the depths of our heritage in pursuit of the spiritual. The exhibition at the Akureyri Art Museum in Iceland is the first general survey of the project".

Lilly Wei, an independent curator based in New York City, writes:

"Rogers believes that accelerating environmental changes with their potentially catastrophic consequences are much less avoidable these days and therefore much more heeded. Hopefully, he is right. Since the inception of his geoglyphs, it has been one of the artist's purposes to point to the irreplaceable beauties of the earth, both existent and man-made. By creating contemporary megaliths as markers, Rogers insists on the need to preserve this natural and artistic heritage for ourselves and for the future".

Three examples of the 'Rhythms of Life' geoglyphs are:

 "The Ancients" This geoglyph is derived from a "pictureglyph" of a pre-Columbian deity known as "El Señor de los Báculos" located in the Rio Loa area near Calama, Chile. The pictureglyph is attributed to the Tiwanaku (also spelled Tiahuanaco) culture that developed between the years 300 and 900 AD.
 This image forms part of the pastoral cosmology. The sun cuts across this "pictureglyph" at the solstice.

Satellite Imagery

Rogers' works are of such proportions that they have been captured in photographs taken by satellite from distances between 440 and 770 km (273–480 miles) above the earth's surface.  They can be easily observed in Google Earth's satellite imagery which has been used to create a tour of the 'Rhythms of Life' Land art project.

Works

Solo exhibitions and displays
 2019—Scott Livesey Galleries, Armadale, Victoria, Australia: Kairos
 2019—Dominik Mersch Gallery, Sydney, New South Wales, Australia: Frisson
 2019—Deakin University Art Gallery, Burwood, Victoria, Australia:  Retrospective Andrew Rogers Evolution
 2018—National Gallery of Australia, Canberra, Australia: Andrew Rogers maquettes and Sculptures 1996-2016
 2017—European Cultural Centre, Collateral Exhibition to the 57th Venice Biennale, Palazzo Mora, Venice, Italy: We Are
 2017—National Gallery of Victoria, Melbourne, Australia:  We Are
 2017—Mossgreen Gallery, Armadale, Victoria, Australia: We Are
 2015—Geelong Gallery, Geelong, Australia: Geoglyphs - the land art projects of Andrew Rogers
 2015—McClelland Sculpture Park+Gallery, Langwarrin, Australia: Andrew Rogers A Retrospective -
Maquettes 1996-2015
 2014—University of Sydney, Australia: individuals, donated from artist, found in front of the Faculty of Law Building
 2013—Dag Hammarskjold Plaza, City of New York, New York, USA: Individuals, May - September
 2013—Elgiz Cagdas Sanat Müzesim, Istanbul, 18 April – 18 June
 2012—Center for Contemporary Arts Santa Fe, New Mexico, USA: Rhythms of Life
 2012—Aidekman Arts Center, Tufts University Art Gallery, Massachusetts, USA: Global Land Art: Projects by Andrew Rogers
 2012—Hammer gallery, Zurich, Switzerland: Rhythms of Life
 2012—Nevada Museum of Art, Nevada, USA: Andrew Rogers Contemporary Geoglyphs
 2011—Art Gallery, Istanbul, Turkey: Andrew Rogers Time and Space
 2011—Momentum, Berlin, Germany:  Time and Space: Drawing on the Earth
 2011—18th Street Arts Center, Santa Monica, California USA: Time and Space
 2009—White Box Gallery, New York, USA:  Andrew Rogers: Odysseys and Sitings (1998–2008)
 2008—William Mora Galleries, Richmond, Australia
 2007—Poprad, Slovakia: Rhythms of Life I-VII
 2007—Akureyri Art Museum, Akureyri, Iceland: Rhythms of Life I-VII
 2007—James Gray Gallery, Santa Monica, California USA
 2007—William Mora Gallery, Richmond, Australia
 2005—Victorian Arts Centre, Melbourne, Australia
 2004—Grounds for Sculpture, New Jersey, U.S.A.
 2004—Gomboc Sculpture Park, W.A. Australia
 2003—Deakin University "Rhythms of Life" Survey Exhibition, Victoria, Australia
 2002—Auronzo di Cadore, Italy
 2002—Le Venezie, Treviso, Italy
 2002—Mudima Foundation, Milan, Italy
 1999—Boritzer Gray Hamano, Santa Monica, California, USA "Rhythms of Life"
 1998—Embassy of Australia, Washington, United States of America, "Rhythms of Life"
 1997—Lauraine Diggins Fine Art, Victoria, Australia, "Rhythms of Life"
 1994—Meridian Gallery, Victoria, Australia "Of Freedom & Will"
 1993—Meridian Gallery, Victoria, Australia "Mankind in the Gesture of an Individual"

Selected group exhibitions
 2019—Desert x 2019, Parallel Project, Rhythms of Life, Yucca Valley, California, USA
 2018—Sculpture by the Sea, Bondi, Sydney, NSW, Australia
 2018—The Wynne Exhibition, Art Gallery of New South Wales, Australia
 2017—Sculpture by the Sea, Bondi, Sydney, NSW, Australia 
 2017—Sculpture by the Sea, Barangaroo, Sydney, NSW Australia
 2017—Mossgreen Gallery, Armadale, Victoria, Australia* 2016—Sculpture Inside, Sculpture by the Sea, Cottesloe, WA, Australia
 2015—Sculpture by the Sea, Bondi, Sydney, NSW, Australia
 2015—Gasworks, Victoria, Australia: From Nature* 2014—Sculpture By the Sea, Sculpture Inside, Cottesloe, WA, Australia
 2014—Lorne Sculpture Biennale, Victoria, Australia 
 2013—Art Miami, Miami, Florida, USA
 2013—Sculpture by the Sea, Sydney, NSW, Australia
 2013—Sydney Contemporary, Sydney, Australia
 2013—Pulse Art Fair, New York, USA
 2013—Art Stage Singapore, Singapore
 2012—Scope Basel, Switzerland
 2012—The Wynne Exhibition, Art Gallery of New South Wales
 2011—The Sculpture Foundation and the City of West Hollywood, California USA: Elemental
 2011—Sculpture by the Sea, Sydney, NSW, Australia
 2011—Sculpture by the Sea, Aarhus, Denmark
 2011—Scope Basel, Switzerland
 2011—Rassegna Internazionale Di Scultura Di Roma
 2010—Art Basel, Miami, USA
 2010—Sculpture by the Sea, Sydney, NSW, Australia
 2010—Scope Basel, Switzerland
 2010—Art Karlsruhe, Germany
 2009—Yeshiva University Museum, New York, USA
 2008—Soho Galleries, Sydney, NSW, Australia
 2007—Sculpture By the Sea, Cottesloe, WA, Australia
 2007—Soho Galleries, Sydney, NSW, Australia
 2007—Corniche Art Fair, Venice, Italy
 2006—Soho Galleries, Sydney, NSW, Australia
 2005—Soho Galleries, Sydney, NSW, Australia
 2004—Soho Galleries, Sydney, NSW, Australia
 2004—Geelong Art Gallery, Victoria, Australia
 2003—Soho Galleries, Sydney, NSW, Australia
 2002—Art Singapore - Contemporary Asian Art, Singapore
 2002—Soho Galleries, Sydney, NSW, Australia
 2001—Sofa, Chicago, USA
 1998—Grounds for Sculpture, New Jersey, USA
 1998—La Trobe University, Victoria, Australia
 1997—Sculpture at Heidelberg Medical Centre, Victoria, Australia
 1994—4th Australian Contemporary Art Fair

Awards (finalist)
 2018—Wynne Prize, Art Gallery of New South Wales 
 2014—McClelland Contemporary Sculpture Survey & Award, Langwarrin, Victoria, Australia
 2012—Mt Buller Sculpture Award, Victoria, Australia
 2012—Wynne Prize, Art Gallery of New South Wales
 2012—McClelland Contemporary Sculpture Survey & Award, Langwarrin, Victoria, Australia
 2011—Sculpture by the Sea, Sydney, NSW, Australia
 2011—Sculpture by the Sea, Aarhus, Denmark
 2010—Sculpture by the Sea, Sydney, NSW, Australia
 2007—Contempora2, Sculpture Award at Docklands, Melbourne, Australia
 2007—Sculpture by the Sea, Cottesloe, WA, Australia
 2006—Sculpture by the Sea
 2005—McClelland Contemporary Sculpture Survey & Award
 2004—Chicago Navy Pier Walk
 2004—Helen Lempriere National Sculpture Award
 2003—McClelland Survey and Sculpture Park, Victoria, Australia
 2002—Sculpture by the Sea, Sydney, NSW, Australia

References

External links 

 

20th-century Australian sculptors
Living people
21st-century Australian sculptors
Year of birth missing (living people)